The Turkmen alphabet ( /  / ) refers to variants of the Latin alphabet, Cyrillic alphabet, or Arabic alphabet used for writing of the Turkmen language.

The modified variant of the Latin alphabet currently has an official status in Turkmenistan.

At the start of the 20th century, when Turkmen started to be written, it used the Arabic script, but in Soviet Turkmenistan in 1928, the Latin script was adopted. In 1940, the Russian influence in Soviet Turkmenistan prompted a switch to a Cyrillic alphabet and a Turkmen Cyrillic alphabet (shown below in the table alongside the Latin) was created. When Turkmenistan became independent in 1991, President Saparmurat Niyazov immediately instigated a return to the Latin script. When it was reintroduced in 1993, it was supposed to use some unusual letters, such as the pound (£), dollar ($), yen (¥) and cent signs (¢), but these were replaced by more conventional letter symbols in 1999. The political and social forces that have combined to bring about these changes of script, then modifications of the Latin script, have been documented by Victoria Clement (2008).

Turkmen is still often written with a modified variant of the Arabic alphabet in other countries where the language is spoken and where the Arabic script is dominant (such as Iran and Afghanistan).

Evolution

Turkmen Arabic Alphabet
The development of a Modern Standardized Turkmen Arabic Alphabet has been an ongoing project in Iran in the past 4 decades. Persian Alphabet, without modification or standardization is of course not suitable for Turkmen as 1. it contains multiple letters for the same consonant sounds, for example there are two letters for the sound [t] (ت، ط), and 2. Persian Alphabet does not have letters and diacritics for many of the vowels used in Turkmen and other Turkic languages. Modern Standardized Turkmen Arabic Alphabet was first developed by late Dr. Hamid Notqi and published in Iranian-Azerbaijani-Turk Varlyq magazine. Since then, this system has been adopted by Iranian-Turkmens, and has been used for the publication of Turkmen Language publications such as "Yaprak" and "Sahra", as well as Turkish State Media TRT (see this link for the Turkmen TRT website). In the year 2010, Mahmyt Atagazly, Iranian-Turkmen literaturist and linguist has compiled Modern Standardized Turkmen Arabic Alphabet in a booklet called "Guideline for Writing Turkmen Correctly". In this booklet, not only has Atagazly presented the Alphabet, he also has reviewed Turkmen phonology and the rules of writing Turkmen to reflect this phonology correctly.

Vowels
In Turkmen Arabic alphabet, 9 vowels are defined.

Vowel Harmony
Like other Turkic languages, Turkmen has a system of vowel harmony. Turkmen's system of vowel harmony is primarily a front/back system. This means that all vowels in a word must be ones that are pronounced either at the front or at the back of the mouth. In Turkmen there are two suffixes that make a plural. It's either ـلِر / ler and ـلار / lar, front and back vowels respectfully. Same variety of options for suffixes exist across the board in Turkmen. Here is how vowel harmony works, in an example of a word in which the vowels are all frontal: 
 The word for dog is ایت / it. The word for dogs will be ایتلِر / itler (ایتلار / itlar is incorrect)
 The word for four is دؤرت / dört, thus the word for all four of us will be دؤردیمیز / dördimiz 
And below are examples for back vowels:
 The word for mountain is داغ / dag, thus the word for mountains will be داغلار / daglar

Another sort of vowel harmony that exists in Turkmen, is the system in which each syllable is required to have one, and only one vowel. This rule even applies to loanwords, who have their pronunciation altered in order to match this rule.

Roundness of vowels
In Turkmen, there's a rule that words do not end in rounded vowels (unlike Azerbaijani Language).

The round vowels o / اوْ and ö / اؤ can only exist in the first syllable. Even if they are heard in pronunciation in other syllables, they should be written as a / ـا or e / ــِـ ە respectively.

The round vowels u / اوُ and ü / اۆ can only exist in the first and second syllable.

Compound words as well as loanwords, are exceptions to these rules.

Vowel Orthography

Of the two forms of the vowels above, some of them happen to have the letter ا in one of their forms, but not the other. These vowels, if at the beginning of the word, will universally be accompanied with ا, but if they happen to be in the middle or end of a word, then the ا will be dropped. The vowel corresponding to the Latin letter u is shown as اوُ / وُ. See examples below for words including this vowel:
 The word for flour is اوُن / un. It is incorrect to spell it as وُن.
 The word for wheat is بوُغدای / bugdaý. It is incorrect to spell it as باوُغدای

In Turkmen, there are two types of syllables, open-ended syllables, which end in a vowel, and close-ended syllables. Open-ended syllables are ones that end in a vowel, i.e. they're in a V or cV form. Close-ended syllables are those that end in a consonant, i.e. they're in a Vc or cVc form. This generally doesn't matter, with the exception of the vowel that represents the same sound as the Latin letter "E". If the syllable is close-ended, the diacritic form of the vowel, ــِـ is used. But if the syllable is open-ended, the ە form is used (similar to how this letter is used as a vowel in Kurdish and Uyghur). Below are examples for the two:
Close-ended syllable: The word dessan (meaning: story) is broken down to two close-ended syllables, des-san. Thus, the diacritic form of the vowel "e" is used: دِسسان. It is worth noting that similar to Persian and Arabic, diacritics are often omitted from writing.
Open-ended syllable: The word erteki is broken down to three syllables, er-te-ki. Thus, the "e" vowel in the second syllable is written as ە, the word is spelt as ارتەکی.

There is one exception to this rule, and that is the suffix "leri", which indicate that a noun is plural and in an objective or possessive case. Despite the suffix consisting of an open-ended syllable, it is written as ـلری.

The Latin letter a is generally written as آ / ـا. This is universally true for words of Turkmen origin. However, loanwords, since they're mostly from Persian or Arabic, and already have a proper and familiar spelling, can retain their original spelling. In Persian or Arabic, the same sound can be represented either by the diacritic ــَـ, or by the letter ع, either with diacritic as عَـ or as عا.

Consonants
While Turkmen Latin Alphabet has 9 vowels and 21 consonants, Turkmen Arabic Alphabet has 32 consonants, as there are sounds that are represented by more than one consonant. The two letters, نگ are treated as one letter, as they are pronounced as a single sound.

Notes
Turkmen words cannot end in the letter ب / b. Instead, a letter پ / p is used. However, In Arabic Alphabet, unlike Latin Alphabet, this rule does not extend to loanwords, such as کباب /kebap. If as part of a suffix, a vowel is added to the end of a word ending in پ / p, this final letter is then replaced with ب / b. This rule doesn't apply to single-syllable words. When the letter ب / b is between two vowels, its pronunciation would be in between [b] (b) and [β] (v).

All originally Turkmen words that have the sound t are to be written using ت. The letter ط, while being pronounced identically, is solely used for writing loanwords.

Turkmen words cannot end in the letter ج / j. Instead, a letter چ / ç is used. However, In Arabic Alphabet, unlike Latin Alphabet, this rule does not extend to loanwords.  If as part of a suffix, a vowel is added to the end of a word ending in چ / ç, this final letter is then replaced with ج / j. For example, the word دۆرتگۆچ / dürtgüç is transformed to دۆرتگۆچیٛ / dürtgüji. This rule doesn't apply to single syllable words, such as ساچ / saç, meaning hair.

Turkmen words cannot end in the letter د / d. Instead, a letter ت / t is used. However, In Arabic Alphabet, unlike Latin Alphabet, this rule does not extend to loanwords. If as part of a suffix, a vowel is added to the end of a word ending in ت / t, this final letter is then replaced with د / d. This rule doesn't apply to single-syllable words.

All originally Turkmen words that have the sound z are to be written using ز. The letters ذ / ض / ظ, while being pronounced identically, are solely used for writing loanwords.

All originally Turkmen words that have the sound S are to be written using س. The letters ث / ص, while being pronounced identically, are solely used for writing loanwords.

The letters ق / غ are exclusive with front vowels, whereas the letter گ is used with back vowels.

The letter غ is never used at the beginning of a word, and it's only used in words where the Latin "G" letter produces a rhotic pronunciation, otherwise, the letter ق is used. This rule does not extend to loanwords.

The Latin letter K is written as ق in presence of front vowels, and it's written as ک in presence of back vowels.

tashdid 
Similar to Persian and Arabic, tashdid diacritic (ــّـ) can be used to mark that a consonant is to be geminated, functionally similar to writing double consonants in Italian and Spanish.
 قصّه / Kyssa
 ینگّه / Ýeňňe
There are two exceptions to where tashdid can be used. 
Firstly, if the double consonant is produced as a result of creating a compound word or addition of a suffix, then tashdid cannot be used and both consonants need to be written. For example, the word سۆممک / sümmek is produced by adding the suffix -mek to the verb root süm. Thus, the correct spelling would be سۆممک, and it is incorrect to spell the word as سۆمّک.

The second exception is, if a word has two consecutive identical consonants as a result of shift in pronunciation of a word, then both consonants need to be written. For example, the word بوْسسان / bossan cannot be written as بوسَانْ. This word is a Persian loanword, originally written as بوستان.

Letter names and pronunciation
Turkmen Alphabet Has 30 Letters.

Long vowels are not shown in the writing.

Sample text (Article 1 of the UDHR) 
 All human beings are born equal in dignity and rights. They are given a mind and a conscience, and they must treat each other in a spirit of brotherhood. (English)
 Hemme adamlar öz mertebesi we hukuklary boýunça deň ýagdaýda dünýä inýärler. Olara aň hem wyždan berlendir we olar bir-birleri bilen doganlyk ruhundaky garaýyşda bolmalydyrlar. (Latin 1999–present)
 همَه آداملار او‌ٔز مرتبسی و حوقوقلری بوْیوُنچا دنگ یاقدایدا دۆنیا اینیألر. اوْلارا آنگ هم وجدان بەرلەندیر و اولار بیر-بیرلری بیلن دوقانلیٛک روُحُنداکیٛ قاراییٛشدا بوْلمالیٛدیٛرلار. (Standardized Turkmen Arabic Alphabet)
 Hemme adamlar öz mertebesi we hukuklary boÿunça deñ ÿagdaÿda dünÿä inÿärler. Olara añ hem wyſdan berlendir we olar bir-birleri bilen doganlyk ruhundaky garaÿy¢da bolmalydyrlar. (Latin 1993–1999)
 Hemme adamlar qz mertebesi we hukuklarx boyunca deng yagdayda dvnyea inyearler. Olara ang hem wxjhdan berlendir we olar bir-birleri bilen doganlxk ruhundakx garayxshda bolmalxdxrlar. (Latin 1992–1993)
 Хемме адамлар өз мертебеси ве хукуклары боюнча дең ягдайда дүнйә инйәрлер. Олара аң хем выждан берлендир ве олар бир-бирлери билен доганлык рухундакы гарайышда болмалыдырлар. (Cyrillic)
 Hemme adamlar өz merteʙesi ve hukuklarь ʙojunca deꞑ jagdajda dynjә injәrler. Olara aꞑ hem vьƶdan ʙerlendir ve olar ʙir-ʙirleri ʙilen doganlьk ruhundakь garajьşda ʙolmalьdьrlar. (Latin 1927–1940)
 Hemme adamlar öz mertebesi ve xuquqları boyunça deñ yağdayda dünyä inyärler. Olara añ hem vıjdan berlendir ve olar bir-birleri bilen doğanlıq ruxundaqı ğarayışda bolmalıdırlar. (Common Turkic Alphabet)
 [he̞mːe̞ ɑːd̪ɑmɫ̪ɑɾ ø̞ːz me̞ɾt̪e̞be̞si βe̞ huquqɫ̪ɑɾɯ bo̞junt͡ʃɑ d̪e̞ŋ jaʁd̪ɑjd̪ɑ d̪ynjæː iːnjæːɾl̪e̞ɾ ‖ o̞ɫɑɾɑ ɑːɴ he̞m βɯʒd̪ɑːn be̞ɾl̪e̞nd̪iɾ βe̞ o̞ɫ̪ɑɾ biːɾbiːɾl̪e̞ɾi bil̪e̞n d̪o̞ʁɑnɫ̪ɯq ruːhund̪ɑːqɯ ɢɑɾɑjɯʃd̪ɑ bo̞ɫmɑɫ̪ɯd̪ɯɾɫ̪ɑɾ ‖] (IPA transcription)

See also
Turkmen Braille

References

Clement, Victoria. 2008. Emblems of independence: script choice in post-Soviet Turkmenistan in the 1990s. International Journal of the Sociology of Language 192: 171-185

External links
 Omniglot
 Turkmen Cyrillic – Latin converter (does not correctly convert <e> or <ý>)

Arabic alphabets
Latin alphabets
Turkmen language
Cyrillic alphabets
Alphabets used by Turkic languages